Brit Awards 2004  was the 24th edition of the annual Brit Awards, a pop music award ceremony in the United Kingdom run by the British Phonographic Industry. The event took place on 17 February 2004 at Earls Court in London. The awards were marked by a set of victories by the rock band The Darkness who won the first British Rock Act award presented at the BRIT Awards. The show was broadcast by the BBC, and attracted 6.18 million viewers.

Performances

Winners and nominees
The nominations were announced on 12 January 2004.

Multiple nominations and awards

References

External links
Brit Awards 2004 at Brits.co.uk

Brit Awards
BRIT Awards
Brit Awards, 2004
Brit Awards, 2004
Brit
Brit Awards